The 1940 season was the Chicago Bears' 21st in the National Football League. The team matched on their 8–3 record from 1939 under head coach George Halas. Behind NFL great Sid Luckman, the club gained a berth in the NFL Championship. There the club stormed the Washington Redskins under the brand new formation known as the T formation to claim their fourth league title. This was the first of four consecutive NFL Western titles for the Bears.

Offseason
The Bears selected Clyde "Bulldog" Turner with their first round pick in the 1940 NFL Draft. He would be with the Bears for four Championships and be inducted into the Pro Football Hall of Fame in 1966.

Regular season

Schedule

Standings

NFL Championship Game
Chicago Bears beat the Washington Redskins 73–0 in the NFL's biggest scoring and most lopsided game in NFL history.

All-Star Game
The Bears defeated the NFL All-Stars 28–14 on December 29, 1940

Chicago Bears
Chicago Bears seasons
National Football League championship seasons
Chicago Bears